Hamid Drake (born August 3, 1955) is an American jazz drummer and percussionist.

By the close of the 1990s, Hamid Drake was widely regarded as one of the best percussionists in jazz and improvised music. Incorporating Afro-Cuban, Indian, and African percussion instruments and influence, in addition to using the standard trap set, Drake has collaborated extensively with top free jazz improvisers. Drake also has performed world music; by the late 1970s, he was a member of Foday Musa Suso's Mandingo Griot Society and has played reggae throughout his career.

Drake has worked with trumpeter Don Cherry, pianist Herbie Hancock, saxophonists Pharoah Sanders, Fred Anderson, Archie Shepp and David Murray and bassists Reggie Workman and William Parker (in many lineups)

He studied drums extensively, including eastern and Caribbean styles. He frequently plays without sticks, using his hands to develop subtle commanding undertones. His tabla playing is notable for his subtlety and flair. Drake's questing nature and his interest in Caribbean percussion led to a deep involvement with reggae.

Early life
Hamid Drake (birth name Henry Lawrence Drake) was born in 1955 in Monroe, Louisiana, and his family moved to Evanston, Illinois, when he was a child. There he started playing with local rock and R&B bands, which eventually brought him to the attention of Fred Anderson, an older saxophonist who had also moved to Evanston from Monroe as a child decades before. Drake worked with Anderson from 1974 to 2010 including on Anderson's 1979 The Missing Link. At Fred Anderson's workshops, a young Hamid met Douglas Ewart, George E. Lewis and other members of Chicago's Association for the Advancement of Creative Musicians (AACM). Another of the most significant percussion influences on Drake, Ed Blackwell, dates from this period. Hamid's flowing rhythmic expressions and interest in the roots of the music drew like~minded musicians together into a performance and educational collective named the Mandingo Griot Society, which combined traditional African music and narrative with distinctly American influences.

Career
Don Cherry, who Drake first met in 1978, was another continuing collaborator. After meeting Don Cherry, Hamid and fellow percussionist Adam Rudolph travelled with Don to Europe, where they explored the interior landscape of percussion and shared deeply in Mr. Cherry's grasp of music's spiritually infinite transformational possibilities. Drake worked extensively with him from 1978 until Cherry's death in 1995.

Drake was one of the founders, along with Foday Musa Suso and Adam Rudolph, of The Mandingo Griot Society. His other frequent collaborators include New York bassist William Parker, saxophonist David Murray, composer and percussionist Adam Rudolph, German free jazz saxophonist Peter Brötzmann and drummer Michael Zerang.   Hamid Drake has played and/or recorded with: Don Cherry, Pharoah Sanders, Fred Anderson, Herbie Hancock, Archie Shepp, bassist William Parker (in many lineups), Reggie Workman, Yusef Lateef, Wayne Shorter, Bill Laswell, David Murray, Joe Morris, Evan Parker, Paolo Angeli, Peter Brötzmann, Jim Pepper, Roy Campbell, Matthew Shipp, Sabir Mateen, Rob Brown, Mat Walerian, Marilyn Crispell, Johnny Dyani, Dewey Redman, Joe McPhee, Adam Rudolph, Hassan Hakmoun, Joseph Jarman, George E. Lewis, John Tchicai, Iva Bittová, Ken Vandermark, and almost all of the members of the AACM. These diverse artists all play in a broad range of musical settings which allows Drake to comfortably adapt to north and west African and Indian impulses as well as reggae and Latin. Although engaged as sideman, he has also devoted his energies and creativity as a band leader; focusing on his own groups and projects such as Bindu and Indigo Trio.

Drake has frequently appeared with jazz legend Archie Shepp in various configurations. The most common is the group Phat Jam along with human beat boxer and rapper Napoleon Maddox. Drake also works with Maddox in the jazz hip hop group ISWHAT?!. Drake performs with European jazz groups, recording with Hungarian musicians such as Viktor Tóth and Mihály Dresch. In addition to the drum set, Drake performs on the frame drum, the tabla, and other hand drums.

Winter solstice concerts by Drake & Zerang Duo
Since 1991 Drake has collaborated with fellow percussionist Michael Zerang to present annual winter solstice concerts. Both musicians have been committed to return to Chicago, from wherever they may be performing, to stage the solstice event which commemorates the northern hemisphere's shortest day. (In most years, about a week later Drake performs again in Chicago with the DKV Trio.) About the winter event Drake has said, 
Occasionally, including in 2020, the Hamid Drake & Michael Zerang Duo have also performed a summer solstice concert in Chicago.  The duo has released two albums – Ask the Sun (1996) and For Ed Blackwell (2015, recorded in 1995).

Partial discography

As leader/coleader
 Emancipation Proclamation: A Real Statement of Freedom (Okka Disk, 1999, [2000]) with Joe McPhee
 The All-Star Game (Eremite, 2000, [2003]) with Marshall Allen, Kidd Jordan, William Parker, and Alan Silva
 Reggaeology (RogueArt, 2010)
 Blissful (RogueArt, 2008)
 Bindu (RogueArt, 2005)
 Hu: Vibrational Universal Mother (Soul Jazz)
 Live at Okuden (ESP-Disk, 2016)
 Some Good News (Otoroku, 2021)
with DKV Trio
 See also: Ken Vandermark discography#DKV Trio

with Indigo Trio
 The Ethiopian Princess Meets the Tantric Priest (RogueArt, 2011)
 Anaya (RogueArt, 2009)
 Live in Montreal (Greenleaf, 2007)

with Mandingo Griot Society
 Mandingo Griot Society
 Mighty Rhythm
 Watto Sitta

with Adam Rudolph
 Contemplations
 12 Arrows
 Dream Garden

with Pharoah Sanders and Adam Rudolph
 Spirits (Meta, 2000)

with Spaceways Inc.
See also: Ken Vandermark discography#with Spaceways Inc.

Various duos
 Drake/Stewart – Timelines
 Drake/Mateen – Brothers Together
 Drake/McPhee – Emancipation Proclamation
 Drake/Tsahar – Live at Glenn Miller Café
 Drake/Tsahar – Soul Bodies vol. 1
 Drake/Zerang – Ask the Sun (1996, Okka Disk/Pink Palace)
 Drake/Zerang – For Ed Blackwell, recorded 1995 (2015, Pink Palace)

As sideman
With Fred Anderson
 Another Place (Moers, 1978) 
 Dark Day (Message, 1979); reissue as Dark Day + Live in Verona (Atavastic, 2001) 
 The Missing Link (Nessa, 1979, issued 1984)
 The Milwaukee Tapes Vol. 1 (Atavistic, 1980, issued 2000) 
 Destiny (Okka Disk, 1995)
 Birdhouse (Okka Disk, 1996)
 Live at the Velvet Lounge (Okka Disk, 1999)
 2 Days in April (Eremite, 2000) 
 Fred Anderson Quartet Volume Two (Asian Improv, 2000)
 On the Run, Live at the Velvet Lounge (Delmark, 2001)
 Back Together Again (Thrill Jockey, 2004)
 Blue Winter (Eremite, 2005)
 Timeless, Live at the Velvet Lounge (Delmark, 2006) 
 From the River to the Ocean (Thrill Jockey, 2007)

with Irene Schweizer and Fred Anderson
 Willisau & Taktlos (Intakt, 2007)

with Malachi Thompson
Freebop Now! (Delmark, 1998)

with Scott Fields
 Five Frozen Eggs (Music and Arts/Clean Feed, 1997/2011)
 Dénouement (Geode/Clean Feed, 1999/2011)

with William Parker
 Painter's Spring (Thirsty Ear, 2000)
 Piercing the Veil (AUM Fidelity, 2001) – reissued in 2007 as Piercing the Veil + First Communion
 O'Neal's Porch (AUM Fidelity, 2000)
 Eloping with the Sun (Riti, 2001) – with Joe Morris and William Danced
 Raining on the Moon (Thirsty Ear, 2002)
 Scrapbook (Thirsty Ear, 2003)
 Sound Unity (AUM Fidelity, 2005)
 Summer Snow (AUM Fidelity, 2005 [2007])
 Corn Meal Dance (AUM Fidelity, 2007)
 Alphaville Suite (RogueArt, 2007)
 I Plan to Stay a Believer (AUM Fidelity, 2010)
 Double Sunrise Over Neptune (AUM Fidelity, 2007)
 Petit Oiseau (AUM Fidelity, 2007)
 Essence of Ellington (Centering, 2012)
 Wood Flute Songs (AUM Fidelity, 2013)
 Organic Grooves [Parker/Drake] – Black Cherry
 Palm of Soul – Jordan/Parker/Drake 
 The Last Dances – Drake/Gahnold/Parker

with Roy Campbell
 Ethnic Stew and Brew

with Herbie Hancock
 Sound-System
 Jazz Africa

with David Murray
 Gwotet
 Live in Berlin
 Waltz Again

with Rob Brown
 The Big Picture (Marge, 2004)

with Albert Beger and William Parker
 Evolving Silence Vol. 1 (Earsay's Jazz, 2005)
 Evolving Silence Vol. 2 (Earsay's Jazz, 2006)

with Chicago Trio
 Velvet Songs (RogueArt, 2011)

with Peter Brotzmann
 Brötzmann/Drake – The Dried Rat–Dog
 Brötzmann/Drake – Brötzmann/Drake
 Brötzmann/Kessler/Drake – Live at the Empty Bottle
 Brötzmann/Mahmoud Gania/Drake – The Wels Concert
 Brötzmann/Moukhtar Gania/Drake – The Catch of a Ghost
 Brötzmann/Kondo/Parker/Drake – Die Like a Dog: Fragments of Music, Life and Death of Albert Ayler
 Brötzmann/Parker/Drake – Never Too Late But Always Too Early
 Brötzmann Chicago Tentet – Broken English
 Brötzmann Chicago Octet/Tentet – The Chicago Octet/Tentet
 Brötzmann Chicago Tentet – Images
 Brötzmann Chicago Tentet – Short Visit to Nowhere
 Brötzmann Chicago Tentet – Signs
 Brötzmann Chicago Tentet – Stone/Water
 Brötzmann/Die Like a Dog – Aoyama Crows
 Brötzmann/Die Like a Dog – Close Up
 Brötzmann/Die Like a Dog – From Valley to Valley
 Brötzmann/Die Like a Dog – Little Birds Have Fast Hearts No. 1
 Brötzmann/Die Like a Dog – Little Birds Have Fast Hearts No. 2
 Parker/Brötzmann – The Bishop's Move
 Drake/Brötzmann/Hopkins – The Atlanta Concert

with Marilyn Crispell and Peter Brötzmann
 Hyperion (Music & Arts, 1995)

with Steve Swell
 Swimming in a Galaxy of Goodwill and Sorrow (RogueArt, 2007)

with IsWhat?!
 You Figure It Out (Hyena, 2004)
 The Life We Chose (Hyena, 2006)

with Painkiller
 50th Birthday Celebration Volume 12 (2003)

with Beans
 Only (with William Parker) (2006)

with Yakuza
 Transmutations (Prosthetic, (2007)

with Joshua Abrams
 Magnetoception (Eremite Records MTE-63/64, (2015)

with Mako Sica
 Ronda (Feeding Tube co-released with Astral Spirits/Instant Classic, (2018)
 Balancing Tear (Feeding Tube co-released with Astral Spirits, 2020)
 Ourania featuring Tatsu Aoki & Thymme Jones (Feeding Tube/Instant Classic, 2021)

with Chico Freeman / George Freeman
 All in the Family (Southport, (2015)

with Pharoah Sanders
 Message from Home (Verve, 1996)

with David S. Ware
 Live in the World (Thirsty Ear, 2005)

with Hugh Ragin
 Revelation (Justin Time, 2004)

References

External links 
 Complete discography
 Hamid Drake at drummerworld.com
 Hamid Drake at RogueArt jazz label
 FMP releases
 Hamid Drake at Allmusic.com
 Hamid Drake/Iswhat?! video interview at Allaboutjazz 

Avant-garde jazz musicians
American jazz drummers
American percussionists
American reggae musicians
Musicians from Chicago
1955 births
Living people
20th-century American drummers
American male drummers
Jazz musicians from Illinois
20th-century American male musicians
American male jazz musicians
Painkiller (band) members
ESP-Disk artists
AUM Fidelity artists
RogueArt artists
FMR Records artists
Okka Disk artists